Brachyolene pictula is a species of beetle in the family Cerambycidae. It was described by Stephan von Breuning in 1940. It is known from Uganda.

References

Endemic fauna of Uganda
Tetraulaxini
Beetles described in 1940
Taxa named by Stephan von Breuning (entomologist)